The 2022–2023 blockade of Artsakh is an ongoing event in the Nagorno-Karabakh conflict. The region is disputed between Azerbaijan and the breakaway Republic of Artsakh, which has an ethnic Armenian population and is supported by neighbouring Armenia. Since 2020, Russian peacekeepers have been deployed to the region under a ceasefire agreement.

On 12 December 2022, Azerbaijani citizens sent by the Azerbaijani government claiming to be "eco-activists" launched a blockade of the Lachin corridor, the only road connecting Artsakh to the outside world and to Armenia. Civil servants, disguised military personnel, members of pro-government NGOs, and youth organisations are among the so-called 'eco-activists', none of whom appear to have taken part in previous environmental protests in Azerbaijan. Only Azerbaijani journalists from state or pro-government media are permitted past checkpoints to cover the blockade. Although the Azerbaijanis claim to have peaceful intentions, their blockade is causing severe consequences for the population; importation of food, fuel, and medicine is blocked, and the 120,000 residents of the region are trapped, creating a humanitarian crisis. Shortages of food, medicine, and electricity are widespread with emergency reserves being rationed alongside massive unemployment. It is widely suspected that the blockade is being orchestrated by the Azerbaijani government as a form of hybrid warfare in its quest to subdue and eventually take control of the region. The authenticity of the claims of "environmental activism" by the "protesters" is under scrutiny. Since 12 December 2022, only vehicles belonging to the International Committee of the Red Cross (ICRC) and the Russian peacekeepers have been able to pass through the Lachin corridor. The government of Armenia has sent limited amounts of essential supplies (medicines, hospital food, infant formulas), transported by ICRC trucks. The ICRC has transferred patients to Armenia for tertiary medical or surgical care.

During the blockade, various vital infrastructure which passes from Armenia to Artsakh through Azerbaijani-controlled territory has been damaged at different times, including gas, electricity, and Internet. For several days during the start of the blockade, Azerbaijan cut off the only natural gas supply to Artsakh; and again on 17 January, 28 January, 6 February, and 10 March. On 10 January, the only high-voltage power line supplying Artsakh was damaged, with Azerbaijan preventing repair teams from accessing the damaged section. Artsakh authorities have resorted to daily 6-hour blackouts in order to ration the limited local electricity production. On 12 January, Internet access in Artsakh was disrupted due to damage to the only broadband internet cables leading into the region, with Artsakh officials accusing Azerbaijan of deliberately severing the connection. Internet was restored after Armenian specialists repaired the damage the next day.

Artsakh officials have proposed the involvement of international environmental inspectors as a solution; however, Azerbaijani officials have refused to communicate with Artsakh representatives, demanding the entry of Azerbaijani inspectors as a condition for lifting the blockade. The blockade has also threatened the ongoing peace process between Azerbaijan and Armenia.

Numerous countries, international organizations, and political analysts have condemned or criticized the blockade, many of which consider it to be a violation of the ceasefire agreement that ended the Second Nagorno-Karabakh War, which stipulates that Azerbaijan guarantee the security of movement along the Lachin corridor in both directions.

Background

The Republic of Artsakh, also known as the Nagorno-Karabakh Republic, is a de facto state located on territory that is internationally recognized as part of Azerbaijan. The vast majority of Artsakh's inhabitants are ethnic Armenians; the mainland of Armenia is located to the west of Azerbaijan. Azerbaijan does not recognize the sovereign status of Artsakh. Despite being offered citizenship, Artsakh residents do not trust Azerbaijan's guarantees of security due to the country's history of human rights abuses, Armenophobia, and lack of rights to ethnic minorities. Since the 2020 Nagorno-Karabakh War, Azerbaijan no longer promises any special status or autonomy to its ethnically Armenian residents. The Republic of Artsakh has also become increasingly dependent on Armenia since territories with vital agricultural, water, and energy resources were surrendered to Azerbaijan as per the ceasefire agreement. As per the 2020 ceasefire agreement, Armenian forces have been removed from the region; however, Russian peacekeeping forces have been given a mandate in the region until 2025.

Artsakh was blockaded for the first time in August 1989, with Azerbaijan severing transport and economic links; this 1989 blockade has continued into the present day. During the Siege of Stepanakert (November 1991 – May 1992; part of the First Nagorno-Karabakh War), Stepanakert, the capital city of Artsakh, was blockaded by Azerbaijani forces, and many civilian targets in the city were bombarded by aircraft and artillery. Turkey has blockaded mainland Armenia since 1993, in support of Azerbaijan's position in the Nagorno-Karabakh conflict. The political isolation and existential threats that Artsakh residents experience from Azerbaijan have cultivated a siege mentality in public life.

Because the Lachin corridor remains the only transportation route in and out of Artsakh, it is often described as an essential "lifeline" to Artsakh residents. The Lachin corridor is also used to supply the region with all of its electricity, Internet, telephone infrastructure, natural gas. In 2017, a second and faster highway was built between Artsakh and Armenia (the Vardenis–Martakert highway), but this alternative route has been closed since Azerbaijan took control of the Dadivank-Sotk section (in Kalbajar) during the Second Nagorno-Karabakh War (2020). There has not been regular air transit into and out of Artsakh since the Stepanakert Airport was closed in 1990 during the First Nagorno-Karabakh War. The Artsakh government has attempted to re-open the commercial airport multiple times since it was reconstructed in 2011 but has been blocked by Azerbaijan, who warns that airplanes flying over Nagorno-Karabakh will be destroyed.

The gas connection to Artsakh has been severed three times by Azerbaijan in 2022, with the longest shutoff period lasting 3 weeks. Many Artsakh and Armenian officials have claimed that Azerbaijan can disrupt the gas supply to Artsakh on demand by means of a control valve that Azerbaijan installed in March 2020 during repair works.

After Azerbaijan closed the Vardenis–Martakert highway in 2020, Artsakh residents expressed fear that Azerbaijan would eventually close the Lachin corridor and in 2021 unsuccessfully petitioned the Russian peacekeeping forces to reopen an alternative route. With the Vardenis–Martakert highway closed, Stepanakert is now a six-hour drive from the nearest accessible international airport in Yerevan, the capital city of Armenia. Meanwhile, Azerbaijan has built two new airports in Zangilan and Fuzuli, located in the Nagorno-Karabakh region, since recapturing these cities from Artsakh in 2020.

As per the 2020 ceasefire agreement, Armenia surrendered the Lachin District to Azerbaijan on 26 August 2022, excluding the five km-wide Lachin corridor, which is controlled by Russian peacekeepers. As part of the ceasefire agreement, parts of the highway are being moved to avoid the cities of Lachin and Shusha, but will still be controlled by Russian peacekeeping forces. Artsakh authorities gave the residents of the villages along the corridor 20 days notice to evacuate. While Aliyev promised that long-term Armenian Lachin residents would be treated as citizens, he branded the remaining residents as illegal settlers and demanded that they be removed. Several analysts consider it unlikely that Azerbaijan will allow electricity, gas, and Internet infrastructure which currently exists along the Lachin corridor to be built along the new highway.

In December 2022, the Azerbaijan government inaugurated its "Great Return" program, which ostensibly promotes the settlement of ethnic Azerbaijanis who once lived in Armenia and Nagorno-Karbakh. As part of this program, a natural gas pipeline will be built between Agdam and Stapanakert which will begin operation in 2025 which is also when the Russian peacekeeping forces' mandate in Nagorno-Karbakh ends.

Azerbaijan has drawn parallels between the Lachin corridor and the Zangezur corridor, a concept which it insists was part of the 2020 ceasefire agreement; in the context of the blockade, according to Azerbaijan, it is merely demanding that the "principle of reciprocity be upheld." Since the end of the Second Nagorno-Karbakh War, Azerbaijan has increasingly promoted irredentist claims to Armenian territory which it describes as "Western Azerbaijan" which have been perceived as a bargaining strategy to force Armenians to relinquish control of Artsakh and concede the Zangezur corridor. Numerous analysts have stated that one of Azerbaijan's objectives in implementing or supporting the blockade is to pressure Armenia to concede an extraterritorial corridor through its country. According to Yeghia Tashjian, West Asia-South Caucasus expert in the European Geopolitical Forum, the future of the Lachin corridor from Azerbaijan's perspective is tied to the fate of the "Zangezur corridor." Speaking about Azerbaijan's demand for the Zangezur corridor, a senior Azerbaijani official reported to Eurasianet in November 2022, "What if we were to install a [border] post at the entrance of Lachin and finish the whole process? How can you breathe with no air?"

Two weeks before the 2022–2023 blockade started, the prime minister of Armenia said at a cabinet meeting, "The President of Azerbaijan is trying to create fictitious grounds for closing the Lachin Corridor, encircling the Armenians of Nagorno-Karabakh, and subjecting them to genocide and deportation under the pretext that Armenia is not fulfilling its obligations."

Blockade timeline

On 3 December, Artsakh information headquarters reported that a group of Azerbaijanis blocked the Lachin corridor between Stepanakert and Gorisat at the intersection around Shusha–Dashalty. The road was later reopened after being closed for four hours, but Azerbaijan announced that it would send specialists to the location of the Russian peacekeepers.

On 10 December, the Ministries of Economy and Environmental Protection and Natural Resources of Azerbaijan issued a joint statement indicating that they would be initiating environmental monitoring in the territory of the Republic of Artsakh. On the same day, a group of Azerbaijanis tried to enter the Kashen mine, but the mine's security staff did not allow it.

On 12 December, a group of Azerbaijanis calling themselves environmentalists blocked the Lachin corridor. According to the group, they are protesting the "illegal" exploitation of mineral deposits in the region. The participants placed tents in the middle of the road. According to Azerbaijani media, environmental groups protested after being denied access to the Drombon and Kashin mines and demanded a meeting with the commander of the Russian peacekeepers, Andrei Volkov. Human Rights Watch reported that Russian peacekeeping forces also barricaded the road to prevent further escalation of the situation if the participants were to advance to the mines in Artsakh.

Between 13 and 16 December, Azerbaijan cut off the gas supply from Armenia to Artsakh. The Azerbaijani gas supply agency Azeriqaz denied involvement.

On the evening of 13 December Azerbaijani media reported that Internal Troops of the Ministry of Internal Affairs of Azerbaijan and the police arrived to the area of the protests to "ensure the security of the participants of the action".

On 14 December, Azerbaijani authorities claimed that it was the Russian peacekeeping forces which were blockading the corridor.

On 16 December the individuals involved added to their list of demands "restoration of control by all state structures of Azerbaijan, including the Ministry of Internal Affairs, the State Border Service, and the State Customs Committee" along the Lachin corridor. One of the Azerbaijani self-described protesters Dilara Efendiyeva created a hotline to appeal for assistance in crossing the blockade; however, this has been dismissed as ingenuine or propaganda by many Armenians. On the same day, 40,000–70,000 Artsakh residents rallied in the capital Stepanakert in protest of the blockade, making it one of the largest protests in Nagorno-Karabakh since the 1988 Karabakh movement.

On 26 December, Armenia's Security Council secretory Armen Grigoryan stated that "Armenia is being forced to provide an extraterritorial corridor [referring to the Zangezur Corridor] and join the Union State," a view which Moscow later denied. This perception was echoed by other Armenian politicians and political analysts who claimed that Russia was using the blockade to obtain concessions from Armenia.

On 27 December, Azerbaijan specified that the blockade would be lifted if state monitors were permitted entry into the mining sites used by Artsakh.

On 28 December, Artsakh authorities halted mining operations at Kashen, pending an "international ecological examination" to disprove Azerbaijani claims of environmental damage. The Kashen mine, operated by Base Metals, is Artsakh's largest corporate taxpayer and private employer.

On 29 December, the Armenian prime minister criticized the Russian peacekeeping forces for not maintaining open transport in and out of Artsakh and suggested the role be delegated to a United Nations peacekeeping mission, a suggestion that Azerbaijan rejected.

On 31 December, efforts to get the United Nations Security Council to issue a joint statement on the blockade were not successful. The exact reason was unknown with responsibility being variously attributed to Azerbaijan, France, and Russia: however, Azerbaijan's ambassador to Belgium and the European Union, Vaqif Sadiqov, credited additional parties for not approving the resolution: "Words of gratitude go to Albania, Russia, UAE & UK! A great job of AZ diplomats!" he wrote in a tweet.

On 5 January 2023, the parliament of Artsakh called on the US, France and Russia to take action to open the corridor or begin the operation of an airlift to Stepanakert's airport to prevent an "urgent humanitarian crisis". Artsakh's state minister, Ruben Vardanyan, said "Pressure from international organizations, European countries and the United States would have great significance. The only solution which will allow us to live normally in this situation in the winter months is the possibility of opening an air bridge."

On 8 January, authorities in Artsakh announced that kindergartens and schools with extended hours will be shut down indefinitely beginning on 9 January due to shortages caused by the blockade.

On 9 January, Artsakh announced that coupons would be issued to people in order to purchase scarce supplies. The government issued a rationing system to commence on January 20 of buckwheat, rice, sugar, pasta and cooking oil.

On 10 January, Armenian prime minister Pashinyan denied claims that Moscow had pressured Armenia to join the Union State of Russian and Belarus but said "the reality isn't as simple as it seems. Sometimes, it's not the text but the subtext that needs to be considered." On the same day President of Azerbaijan, Ilham Aliyev in a press conference talking about Lachin corridor stated that: "whoever does not want to become our citizen, the road is not closed, it is open. They can leave, they can go by themselves, no-one will hinder them."

On 10 January, the electricity operator of Artsakh reported that the high-voltage power line supplying electricity to Artsakh from Armenia was damaged on the Aghavno-Berdzor section of the corridor under Azerbaijani control and that Azerbaijan is hindering restoration works on the line. In addition, the Armenian Prime Minister announced that the planned CSTO military exercises would not be held in Armenia due to the situation, while Moscow downplayed Armenia's refusal to host the alliance.

On 12 January, there were widespread Internet outages in Artsakh that lasted an hour and caused fear among local residents. In a Stepanakert-Yerevan online conference, then State Minister Vardanyan stated "We have three choices: to become citizens of Azerbaijan, to leave, or to overcome this situation. This is the struggle for life, we must do everything in our power."

On 17 January, according to Artsakh's InfoCenter, Azerbaijan blocked the only gas pipeline delivering gas to Artsakh from Armenia again.

On January 18, Artsakh's ombudsman reported that Azerbaijanis halted a car escorted by Russian peacekeepers that was carrying children returning to Stepanakert. The Azerbaijanis broke into the car while filming the incident, causing a commotion with one of the children fainting.

On 19 January, the European Parliament adopted a resolution condemning the blockade, describing it as a humanitarian crisis and a violation of the 2020 ceasefire declaration. It also called for Azerbaijan to "protect the rights of Armenians living in Nagorno-Karabakh and refrain from its inflammatory rhetoric that calls for discrimination against Armenians and urges Armenians to leave Nagorno-Karabakh." The resolution also "Condemns the inaction of Russian 'peacekeepers'; considers that their replacement with OSCE international peacekeepers, under a UN mandate, should be negotiated urgently"

On 8 February, the Russian Foreign Ministry rejected suggestions that EU or UN peacekeepers could be brought in.

On 18 February, a panel discussion was held on the sidelines of the 2023 Munich Security Conference. The Prime Minister of Armenia Pashinyan discussed the humanitarian consequences of Azerbaijan's blockade. The live streaming broadcast was interrupted on various official Azeri state media channels right after Pashinyan talked about how the elections in Armenia after the second Nagorno-Karabakh War were held in a democratic and free competitive environment.

On 22 February, the International Court of Justice applied an interim measure requiring Azerbaijan to take all measures at its disposal to ensure unimpeded movement of persons, vehicles and cargo along the Lachin Corridor in both directions.

Humanitarian crisis

The blockade is creating a humanitarian crisis due to the Republic of Artsakh losing regular supplies of food, fuel and medicine; before the blockade, the territory received 400 tons of food and medicine daily. Various vital infrastructure which passes from Armenia to Artsakh through Azerbaijani-controlled territory has also been damaged at different times during the blockade: including gas, electricity, and Internet. On the night that the second phase of the blockade began (12 December), more than 1,100 Artsakh citizens were stranded on the roads in cold winter conditions. Among the stranded citizens are 270 children, many of whom were returning from attending the Junior Eurovision Song Contest 2022 in Yerevan; they have been grounded in Armenian territory and are unable to return home. Hundreds of families have been divided. Schools and other educational institutions have been suspended. Among the 120,000 people blockaded are 30,000 children, 20,000 elderly, and 9,000 disabled people.

Lack of access to supplies and medical care 
Shortages of food and medicine are widespread, and emergency reserves are being rationed. Being the only road to the outside world and to Armenia, Artsakh residents depend on the Lachin corridor for supplies of food, medicine, fuel and other essential goods. Before the blockade, the region received 400 tons of food and medicine from Armenia daily. There is massive unemployment: according to News.am, as of 16 January, 17.7% of all businesses in Artsakh have suspended operations due to the blockade, and more than 14,000 tons of food and supplies which would have been delivered to Artsakh ordinarily have been barred from entry.

Several isolated communities along the corridor to the west of the protests that have been cut off from both Armenia and the rest of Artsakh, rendering them completely isolated: Mets Shen, Hin Shen, Yeghtsahogh and Lisagor. It has become impossible to deliver food and other basic necessities to these communities from either Armenia or Artsakh.

On January 20, Artsakh authorities announced a coupon-based food rationing system that allocates one kilogram of pasta, buckwheat, rice, and sugar and a litre of cooking oil per month.

A BBC News article from 6 January stated that the only product left for sale at the main market was dried thyme, that shop shelves were empty in all of Stepanakert, and that all basic medication had run out, even at the hospital.

The transfer of critically ill patients from Artsakh to Yerevan remains nearly impossible, with one death resulting from the situation. Artsakh officials have reported that 580 people are unable to receive surgery.

The International Red Cross has distributed food, medical supplies, and hygiene items across the corridor, including to eight hospitals, a physical rehabilitation center harboring 300 destitute elderly people, and a center supporting children from vulnerable families

ICRC has reported that since the start of the blockade they have transferred 99 patients in urgent need of medical care and reunited 259 persons with their families. Since 22 January 2023, Russian peacekeeping forces have also reported delivering convoys with humanitarian cargo through the Lachin corridor, and distribution of food parcels to the residents of Martuni and Askeran on 25 January and Mardakert and Stepanakert on 26 January 2023.

According to Amnesty International, the humanitarian aid delivered by the ICRC and the Russian peacekeepers is insufficient to meet demand.

Damage to infrastructure 
Various vital infrastructure which passes from Armenia to Artsakh through Azerbaijani-controlled territory has been damaged at different times during the blockade, including gas, electricity, and Internet. Various sources, including but not limited to Armenian media, have alleged that sabotage may have been involved.

Gas supplies have been cut numerous times; first between 13 and 16 December 2022, and again on 17 January, 28 January, February 6, and March 10, 2023. Several Armenian media repeated previous allegations that the gas cuts were triggered by a control valve installed by Azerbaijan in March 2022. Residents have resorted to using wood stoves for heating.

On 10 January, the only high-voltage power line from Armenia to Artsakh was damaged, with Azerbaijan preventing repair teams from accessing the damaged section. As a result, Artsakh authorities announced that daily blackouts would be instituted (lasting on average 6-hours) to ration the limited local electricity-production.

On 12 January, internet access in Artsakh was disrupted due to damage to the only broadband internet cables leading into the region, with Artsakh officials accusing Azerbaijan of deliberately severing the connection. The internet was restored after Armenian specialists repaired the damage the next day.

Authenticity of the "environmental activism" claims 
The authenticity of the "environmental activism" claims by the blockade participants is under scrutiny and has been condemned by many countries, international organizations, and political analysts. It is widely suspected that the blockade is being orchestrated by the Azerbaijani government. There is also little evidence to suggest that there is a specific environmental issue within Artsakh that is justifying the protests.

Involvement of the Azerbaijani Government 
According to media outlets such as Eurasianet, there is "plenty of evidence" to indicate that the Azerbaijani government is involved in the blockade, such as the fact that some of the participants work for Azerbaijani state-affiliated organizations and are promoted by the Azerbaijani government. The Azerbaijani government has provided the "protestors" with tents and food. The foreign minister of Azerbaijan, Jeyhun Bayramov has also said that the participants' demands must be met in order to lift the blockade.

Judging by videos from the scene, those among the ranks of the participants include the employees of state-owned companies, military servicemen, and workers from Turkish companies. Mikroskop Media analyzed about 50 videos of the blockade and concluded that among those involved are government-funded  Azerbaijani NGOs and representatives from the ruling New Azerbaijan Party who "have nothing to do with ecology and [the] environment." Some of the participants appear to be bused in and out from the Kharibulbul Hotel in Shusha.

Azerbaijan considers entering Nagorno-Karabakh and surrounding territories without permission from Azerbaijani authorities a criminal offence. According to Bashir Kitachayev, a journalist from Azerbaijan, the "protestors" are therefore officially endorsed by the government as they must have passed through this region in order to reach the Lachin road.

With a handful of exceptions, only Azerbaijani journalists from state or pro-government media can directly cover the blockade going on in the Lachin corridor. A Spanish journalist was escorted to the blockade by "guides" from an Azerbaijani state-owned government group; however, the journalist was not permitted to speak with the Russian peacekeepers and was deliberately misquoted by Azeri state media  as saying that vehicles could pass freely when, in fact, he said the exact opposite. Meydan TV reported that two of its employees and an independent journalist were "detained by civilians and black masked men while going to prepare a report" from the blockade location. Before being escorted to Baku, their cameras were confiscated and their footage was deleted.

The Azerbaijan government has also paid public relations firms to produce expert-signed op-eds which recite Azerbaijani propaganda that environmental concerns underlie the ongoing blockade. Azerbaijan considers entering Nagorno-Karabakh and surrounding territories without permission from Azerbaijani authorities a criminal offence. According to Bashir Kitachayev, a journalist from Azerbaijan, the "protestors" are therefore officially endorsed by the government as they must have passed through this region in order to reach the Lachin road.

Azerbaijan has an economic interest in the mines located within Artsakh; in July 22, 2022 the Azerbaijani government signed a $3 billion dollar deal that leases mines located in Artsakh to the company Anglo Asian Mining. Businesses connected to the family of Azerbaijan's President Aliyev are stakeholders in the mining operation.

Scrutiny of the protests and environmental claims 
With regards to the liberal nature of  the "protest", critics have pointed out that freedom of assembly is not a recognized civil right in Azerbaijan, where protests are quickly stopped by authorities. Sheila Paylan, international human rights lawyer, points that that even during the Lachin corridor "protest", Azerbaijan has cracked down on other protests in its territory. She says "Azerbaijan’s sudden change of heart in respect of these particular protests is therefore per se discriminatory as they exclusively target Armenians."

The participants of the blockade do not appear to have an extensive history of eco-activism. Outwardly, the blockade action appears more political than environmental. The participants and certain government officials claim that the Artsakh government is "illegally" mining metal and refuse requests for the environmental impact to be inspected. Artsakh officials have proposed the involvement of international environmental inspectors as a solution; however, Azerbaijani officials refuse to communicate with Artsakh representatives, demanding the entry of Azerbaijani inspectors as a condition for lifting the blockade.

Critics have argued that Azerbaijan is weaponizing environmentalism in order to achieve it's goals. Other critics have said that the environmental pollution created by Azerbaijan's own extraction of fossil fuels – which generates a third of the country's GDP and 88% of its export revenue – has been ignored while the government and the "protestors" focus on Nagorno-Karabakh. In a Time article, Simon Maghakyan described Azerbaijan as a "petro-aggressor," writing that "[making] a mockery of the existential crisis we face as a species, [the blockade] serves to further corrode Azerbaijan's civil society." He also argues that the Absheron Peninsula of Azerbaijan, considered by local scientists to be "the ecologically most devastated area in the world" has been ignored during the blockade. Mikroskop Media has pointed out that Azerbaijan itself has recently leased the extraction of minerals in Kalbajar, a region Artsakh surrendered to Azerbaijan in 2020.

A number of inconsistencies have been observed between the visible attitudes of the participants and the demands that an environmentalist mobilization usually raises. For example, the participants have carried a large flag of Azerbaijan, and many of them have wrapped national flags around themselves. Furthermore, several participants have worn fur coats, which lends doubt as to whether the participants genuinely care about the environment.

Nationalist slogans have taken the place of environmental ones, and the participants have been photographed making the hand symbol of the Gray Wolves, a Turkish ultra-nationalist organization with a history of committing violence against minorities in Turkey, including Armenians. The participants have also been recorded shouting Azerbaijani military chants, such as "the best soldier is the Azerbaijani soldier."

Early in the blockade, the participants released white doves (i.e. pigeons) to symbolically represent peace among nations; however, one of the pigeons was accidentally strangled to death by a woman in a fur coat as she gripped the bird and shouted through a loudspeaker. The suffocated pigeon became a symbol for the intentions of the blockade to Armenians, with hashtags such as "#WeAreThePigeon" being posted on social media. One resident told OC Media: "They say we should live peacefully together, but they want to suffocate us like that pigeon she strangled to death. It was a hint, many just didn't get it. They just want to do the same with us."

Lawsuits

International Court of Justice 
Armenia applied to the International Court of Justice with a request to apply interim measures and oblige Azerbaijan to stop organizing and supporting the alleged demonstrations that have blocked free movement in both directions through the Lachin corridor. The hearing was part of a larger case that Armenia filed in 2020 alleging Azerbaijan “has breached a convention against racial discrimination."

On February 22, 2023 the court reached a legally binding ruling after a 13–2 vote, thus satisfying the request from Armenia by applying the interim measure and demanding that Azerbaijan: "take all measures at its disposal to ensure unimpeded movement of persons, vehicles and cargo along the Lachin corridor in both directions," The court declined Armenia’s request to order Azerbaijan to "cease its orchestration and support of the alleged 'protests' in Lachin corridor," considering this further measure unwarranted given the previously approved directive. 

The court also stated that Armenia had not provided sufficient evidence that Azerbaijan is disrupting the supply of natural gas to ratify Armenia's additional request to direct Azerbaijan to "immediately fully restore and refrain from disrupting or impeding the provision of natural gas and other public utilities to Nagorno-Karabakh.” On the same day the court unanimously rejected the counterclaim filed by Azerbaijan, requesting for provisional measures against Armenia on alleged transportation and placing of mines.  To date, Azerbaijan has ignored the decisions of the ICJ.

European Court of Human Rights 
On December 14, 2022, Armenia applied to the ECHR requesting to oblige Azerbaijan to unblock Lachin corridor and to apply interim measures. In turn, Azerbaijan applied to the ECHR on December 22, demanding to annul the decision to apply measures against itself and to impose interim measures against Armenia. In response to this, in January 2023, the Armenian side provided the ECHR with information about the humanitarian crisis caused by the blockade and requested intervention in resolving the issue from the Committee of Ministers of the Council of Europe, which controls implementation of the decisions of the ECHR.

On January 17, the ECHR sent an urgent notice on the issue of the Lachin corridor to the Committee of Ministers of the Council of Europe satisfying the request made by Armenia and also rejected Azerbaijan's request to take measures against Armenia.

Reactions

Numerous countries, international organizations, and political analysts have condemned the blockade or implied that Azerbaijan is deliberately orchestrating the crisis as an attempt to take control over Artsakh. Several organizations and scholars specializing in genocide studies have also warned of genocide risk factors. Certain critics have said that the poorly defined mandate of the Russian peacekeeping forces, Russia's invasion of Ukraine, or Russia's economic interests in Azerbaijani oil may be contributing to the inaction of the peacekeepers.

Thomas de Waal, a political analyst and author of several books on the Nagorno-Karabakh conflict, wrote that the environmental activists were "evidently sent there by the [Azerbaijani] government" and are comparable to the "little green men" used by Russia to occupy Crimea in 2014. De Waal also said, "The eco-activists give Baku 'plausible deniability'. Since 2020, Azerbaijan has been in the dominant position in this dispute and it has certain things it wants to achieve. It uses both negotiations and force. When negotiations don't go so well from its point of view, it uses force." Commenting on the blockade, Azerbaijani political expert Agshin Kerimov predicts "the process will end with the establishment of Baku's sovereign rights over the entire territory of Karabakh." The director of an influential Azerbaijani political think tank, Topchubashov Center, Rusif Huseynov said "The current standoff is a win-win situation for Baku. If [Azeri] officials are allowed into Karabakh and to inspect the mines, it would mean everyone, including the Russian peacekeepers and 'Nagorno-Karabakh Republic' leadership acknowledges and further legitimizes Azerbaijan's sovereignty over the territory."

According to Markéta Gregorová, a Czech MEP and the EU-Azerbaijan Cooperation Council, an agreement signed between the EU and Azerbaijan to replace Russian imports of gas has undermined the EU's ability to apply pressure. Nathalie Loiseau, a French MEP and chair of the European Parliament's Subcommittee on Security and Defense said "the blockade is "illegal, cruel and contradictory with Baku's claims that the territory belongs to Azerbaijan. Which country would intentionally prevent its own people from receiving food or medicine?" Michael Rubin, senior fellow at the American Enterprise Institute (AEI) and ex-Pentagon official wrote "Azerbaijani President Ilham Aliyev's attempt to starve, if not eradicate, Armenian Christians was predictable...Dictators precipitate famines when they believe they can murder opponents without consequence."

Ten different human rights organizations have issued a collective genocide warning: "All 14 risk factors for atrocity crimes identified by the UN Secretary-General's Office on Genocide Prevention are now present...The current Azerbaijani aggression against the Armenians of Nagorno-Karabakh conforms to a long pattern of ethnic and religious cleansing of Armenian and other Christian communities in the region by the government of Azerbaijan, the Republic of Turkey, the Ottoman Empire, and their partisans."

Caucasus expert Laurence Broers draws parallels between "the Russian discourse about Ukraine as an artificial, fake nation, and the Azerbaijani discourse about Armenia, likewise claiming it has a fake history", thus elevating the conflict to an "existential level".

Involved parties

  – The Ministry of Foreign Affairs of Armenia stated that the provocative actions of Azerbaijan may lead to a large-scale humanitarian disaster The prime minister of Armenia criticized Russian forces whose mandate is to secure transport in and out of the region as "becoming a silent witness to the depopulation of Nagorno-Karabakh." Margaryan, Permanent Representative of Armenia, told the U.N. Security Council that "the ongoing blockade is not just one isolated case, but another demonstration of systematic violence used by the Azerbaijani authorities to subject the people of Nagorno-Karabakh to ethnic cleansing." Certain Armenian officials have suggested that Russia is using the blockade to obtain concessions from Armenia. President of Armenia Vahagn Khachaturyan stated that by closing the Lachin road, Azerbaijan is not fulfilling its obligations and that while 300–400 vehicles used to pass this road daily, transporting vital necessities for the population of Nagorno-Karabakh, only 400 vehicles carrying humanitarian goods have since passed in 40 days
  Artsakh – The President of Artsakh, Arayik Harutyunyan said the "aggressive behavior of Azerbaijan, through which it terrorizes our population, is highly unacceptable". Vagram Balayan, leader of the Dashnak parliamentary faction of Artsakh, said 'the Azeris actually do not want any negotiations, they just want us to disappear from history." Ruben Vardanyan, the former state minister for Artsakh said "The message that Azerbaijan is sending with these eco-activists is either you leave or you accept our rule of law, or you will starve and die because nobody cares about you all."
  – continues to deny the blockade claiming that "civilian transport can move freely in both directions" and voiced "readiness to meet humanitarian needs of ethnic Armenians living on Karabakh". The Spokesperson for the ministry, Ayxan Hajizade, called claims of a blockade "fake news." Azerbaijan's president Ilham Aliyev praised the individuals blockading Nagorno-Karabakh, saying that "they show the whole world how high-quality the Azerbaijani youth are" and stated "it is simply unfair to call the events happening on the Lachin – Khankendi road a blockade." Aliyev said that residents who do not want to live in Nagorno-Karabakh as Azerbaijani citizens are free to leave. He also stated that within a month, about four hundred trucks of peacekeepers had passed through the corridor, and had also taken food and other necessary goods to Nagorno-Karabakh residents. Aliyev also stated that the Red Cross was granted permission to pass as many times as they asked.
  – The Russian Foreign Affairs spokeswoman Maria Zakharova stated on the third day of the blockade that "Russia's defense ministry and the Russian peacekeeping contingent have been actively working to de-escalate the situation and we expect full transport links to be restored in the very near future." On 12 January 2023, Zakharova stated: "We continue to work on complete unblocking of the Lachin corridor in accordance with the tripartite statement of the leaders of Russia, Armenia and Azerbaijan of November 9, 2020." On 18 January 2023, Russia's foreign minister Sergei Lavrov stated that Russian defense officials are investigating Azerbaijan's allegations that Armenia was transporting land mines through the Lachin corridor. He also proposed that Russian peacekeepers could examine cargo transported via this road, adding that he believed the issue would be settled shortly.

International
  – Ambassador Filho called for open channels of dialogue and said "any obstruction jeopardizes the well-being of the people of Nagorno-Karabakh and threatens the reconciliation process between Armenia and Azerbaijan."
  – The Foreign Ministry called on Azerbaijan to open the Lachin corridor.
  – The Foreign Ministry called on Azerbaijan to lift the blockade and restore gas supply.
  – The Ministry of Foreign Affairs expressed concern about the blockade which poses "severe human suffering of the local population in Nagorno-Karabakh".
  – The Foreign Ministry called for the unblocking of the Lachin corridor without any conditions and to respect the rights of the Armenians living in Nagorno-Karabakh. Speaker of parliament Yaël Braun-Pivet during her visit to Yerevan stated that her country is concerned about the blockade of Nagorno-Karabakh and the deepening humanitarian crisis, and that in order to achieve a peaceful and lasting solution, it is necessary to restore dialogue between Armenia and Azerbaijan. She also said that France will not impose sanctions on Azerbaijan.
  – Commissioner for Human Rights and Humanitarian Assistance called for the restoration of free movement of people, vehicles and goods on the Lachin corridor as soon as possible, noting the risk of grave humanitarian effects for civilians in Nagorno-Karabakh. On 7 February 2023, Foreign Minister Annalena Baerbock called for immediate reopening of Lachin corridor, emphasizing the humanitarian consequences of the blockade.
  – The Ministry of Foreign Affairs called on the Azerbaijani authorities to ensure freedom and security of movement and transport without any preconditions, and that the local population should be spared from hardships and distress.
  – called on Azerbaijan to immediately and unconditionally restore freedom and security in the Lachin corridor.
  – The Foreign Ministry said it deeply regrets the closure of the Lachin corridor and impact on the livelihood and humanitarian conditions in the area.
  – The Ministry of Foreign Affairs expressed concern about the continuing blockade and its resulting severe humanitarian consequences for Nagorno-Karabakh.
  – The Foreign Minister Jean Asselborn called on Azerbaijan to ensure free and safe movement along the Lachin corridor stating that Nagorno-Karabakh is "the homeland of Armenians and nobody has the right to block this Lachin corridor and I hope that those who have the means to interfere that they will do it as effective as possible".
  – The Ministry of Foreign Affairs called for the unblocking of the Lachin corridor, and for Armenia and Azerbaijan to restart peace negotiations. The Netherlands parliament adopted a resolution calling on the government to urge the European Council to pressure Azerbaijan to cease hostilities against the people of Artsakh and to open the Lachin Corridor. It also stated that: "Russian peacekeepers do not intervene in that area, and that this situation threatens to create a humanitarian emergency for the population of Nagorno-Karabakh."
  – The Minister of Foreign affairs Mona Juul called on Azerbaijan to guarantee safe movement across the Lachin corridor: "It is in nobody's interest to trigger an avoidable humanitarian situation in Nagorno-Karabakh...The international community cannot just "weather the storm" in the hopes that [the situation] will go away"
  – It's senate unanimously adopted a resolution, calling on Azerbaijan to lift the blockade and restore free movement on Lachin corridor without delay or preconditions.
  – It's congress unanimously adopted a statement which "Calls on the Azerbaijani authorities to ensure the freedom and safety of movement along the corridor in accordance with the trilateral declaration of November 9, 2020. Restrictions on free movement cause great suffering to the population and can create a humanitarian crisis."
  – The Ambassador to Azerbaijan Cahit Bağcı, personally visited the blockade, writing on Twitter, "Karabakh is Azerbaijan."
   – the Minister of State for European Affairs Leo Docherty has expressed concern that the blocking of the Lachin corridor and disrupting gas supplies in winter risks severe humanitarian consequences.
  – Department of State spokesman Ned Price said that the closure of the corridor has serious humanitarian consequences and called on Azerbaijan to restore free movement through the Lachin corridor. Department Deputy Spokesperson Vedant Patel said on 16 December that closure of the Lachin corridor has potentially severe humanitarian implications, calling for the restoration of free movement through the corridor as soon as possible. Ambassador Robert A. Wood, Alternative Representative for Special Political Affairs, called on "the government of Azerbaijan and others responsible for the corridor's security to restore free movement, including for humanitarian and commercial use, as soon as possible" during the UN Security Council meeting on 20 December 2022. On 22 December 2022, US National Security Advisor Jake Sullivan expressed ongoing concern of the United States over impeded access to the Lachin corridor and the growing humanitarian implications of this situation, calling to fully restore the free movement through the corridor. Five USA congress members issued a separate statement: "It is disturbing that the only time the people of Azerbaijan are allowed to freely protest is when it threatens the lives of Armenians...We urge the United States and our European partners to use every diplomatic tool at their disposal to halt this clearly fabricated crisis created by Azerbaijan."
  – On 4 January, the mayor sent a letter to President Biden urging the United States "come to the aid of the people of Artsakh". The mayor issued this statement after a cordon of Armenian truckers paralysed the traffic around her residence to bring attention to the brewing humanitarian crisis.
  – It's senate called for the end of the blockade of Artsakh by Azerbaijan putting an end to the harassment of the civilian population, and expressed solidarity with the people of Artsakh.
  – Pope Francis expressed concern about "precarious humanitarian conditions of the people, which are in further danger of deteriorating during the winter season," speaking of the "situation created in the Lachin corridor in the South Caucasus." On 29 January 2023, he reiterated his plea to find a peaceful solution to "grave humanitarian situation in the Lachin Corridor.", calling the conditions that the blockade created for the local population "inhumane".

Supranational
  – "The EU calls on Azerbaijan to ensure freedom of movement, and that restrictions to such freedom of movement cause significant distress to the local population and creates humanitarian concerns." PACE co-rapporteurs for the monitoring of Azerbaijan and Armenia also released a joint statement urging for urgent restoration of freedom of movement along the Lachin corridor. Nathalie Loiseau, Chair of the European Parliament's Subcommittee on Security and Defence, said that the EU should use its economic ties to put pressure on Azerbaijan to end the blockade, saying "we mustn't shy away from defending universal values. If we don't do it, who will act?" Josep Borrell, High Representative for Foreign Affairs and Security Policy, stated that the EU is not considering imposing sanctions on Azerbaijan, and its efforts are focused on achieving solutions through dialogue. 
 The Renew Europe Group of the EU Parliament called on Azerbaijan to unconditionally end the blockade. Nathalie Loiseau, the MEP that initiated the resolution, said "it is more than a blockade that he [President Aliyev] is imposing, more than blackmail, it is ethnic cleansing that he wants."
  – Dunja Mijatović, its Commissioner for Human Rights, issued a statement expressing concern about the situation: "Movement along the Lachin corridor should be restored as a matter of urgency to prevent a deterioration of the humanitarian situation in Nagorno-Karabakh".
  – The blockade was discussed by the UN Security Council. All members of the Security Council who spoke called on Baku to ensure free and safe movement along the Lachin corridor; however, no resolution was adopted following the meeting.
  – stated that: "Children are being impacted by the virtual closure of access to Nagorno-Karabakh via the Lachin corridor. The longer the situation persists, the more children will experience the lack of basic food items, while access to many of the essential services they need for their survival, healthy growth and well-being will become more challenging. Many children have also been deprived of parental care as they have been separated from their parents or legal guardians."
  – Secretary General Stanislav Zas stated that the problem at the Lachin corridor is outside of its responsibility.
 The U.S. Helsinki Commission issued a statement: "The blocking of trade and transit on the Lanchin corridor is contributing to a humanitarian catastrophe in Karabakh, and should be lifted immediately. Azerbaijan has a moral responsibility for ensuring the welfare of Karabakh Armenians."

Non-governmental organizations
 The Lemkin Institute for Genocide Prevention – issued three "Red Flag Alerts" on Azerbaijan since the blockade began, describing it as "a criminal act which intends to create terror and unbearable conditions of life for the population of Artsakh. These events are not isolated events; they are, instead, being committed within a larger genocidal pattern against Armenia and Armenians by the Azerbaijani regime." The group also wrote "The genocidal intent of Baku has never been clearer and the actions carried out up to the moment highly predict this outcome."
 International Association of Genocide Scholars – condemned the blockade and Azerbaijan's "deliberate attacks on ... [Artsakh's] ...critical infrastructure." The group noted "significant genocide risk factors exist in the Nagorno-Karabakh situation concerning the Armenian population." The government of Azerbaijan, encouraged by its ally Turkey, has long promoted official hatred of Armenians, has fostered impunity for atrocities committed against Armenians, and has issued repeated threats to empty the region of its indigenous Armenian population."
 Christian Solidarity International – President John Eibner condemned the blockade, stating: "The process of the Armenian Genocide has been ongoing since the Ottoman massacres of the late nineteenth century. Now, by placing Nagorno-Karabakh under blockade, the dictatorship of Azerbaijan is clearly telegraphing its intent to carry out another phase of the Genocide". CSI also released a statement: "CSI stands in solidarity with the Armenian Christians of Nagorno-Karabakh. We support their right to govern themselves in their homeland, and we call on the United States, the United Kingdom, and the European Union, and the Russian Federation to compel Azerbaijan to end the siege of Nagorno Karabakh."
 Aurora Humanitarian Initiative – Members of the Aurora Humanitarian Initiative condemned Azerbaijan's government for the blockade and drew parallels between the humanitarian crisis it created and the 1948 Berlin blockade by Soviet Union.
 World Medical Association – Dr. Frank Ulrich Montgomery, Chair of the WMA Council, urged the Azerbaijan Government to ensure safe access through the Lachin corridor, a critical route for the delivery of vital food and medical supplies, to avoid this humanitarian crisis getting worse.
 Freedom House – wrote "We call on the international community to reiterate its support for negotiations without coercion. Azerbaijan must cease its blockage of the Lachin corridor."
 Genocide Watch – issued an alert in September 2022 over conditions in the area. The report stated, "Due to its unprovoked attacks and genocidal rhetoric against ethnic Armenians, Genocide Watch considers Azerbaijan's assault on Armenia and Artsakh to be at Stage 4: Dehumanization, Stage 7: Preparation, Stage 8: Persecution, and Stage 10: Denial."
 Human Rights Watch – stated "whether the protesters have genuine environmental concerns or other grievances, Azerbaijan should...ensure the road remains open and [that] the protest does not deny Nagorno-Karabakh residents their rights of access to essential services and goods, and to freedom of movement." In a subsequent report on hardships caused by the blockade of the "lifeline rode" it reiterated the importance of ensuring residents their rights "including the right of access to health, essential services and goods, and to freedom of movement".
 Amnesty International – stated "Azerbaijan must end the blockade of the Lachin corridor, which has left residents of Nagorno Karabakh without access to essential goods and services" after 1 month of the blockade. It issued another urgent call to immediately lift the blockade on the 60th day of the blockade, reporting that it's "putting thousands of lives in peril", causing serious hardship for access to healthcare, exacerbating human rights costs by causing food and fuel shortages and highlighted that Azerbaijan fails its human rights obligations by taking no action to lift the blockade.
 Socialist International – said in a statement that "We urge the Azerbaijan authorities to ensure freedom and security of movement along the corridor, in line with the trilateral statement of 9 November 2020. The humanitarian situation is critical and hence the SI strongly calls on the parties to dialogue and negotiation and prevent the humanitarian crisis the blocking may cause in the civil population."
 International Disability Alliance – issued a joint statement with the European Disability Forum (EDF), condemning the blockade of the "lifeline road", which "has led to a series of human rights violations as well as denial of humanitarian access that has a disproportionately negative impact on persons with disabilities. As a result of the blockade...more than 9,000 persons with disabilities face grave human rights violations."
 The Interparliamentary Assembly on Orthodoxy – stated: "In the most unequivocal terms we condemn the unacceptable blockade of the Armenian population in Nagorno-Karabakh for over a month now, under false pretenses by organizations and the authorities of Azerbaijan, endangering the lives of 120,000 Armenian who remain in their ancestral homes. We call the international community to immediately intervene towards a solution of this peculiar siege of the Armenian population, which aims at their extermination or displacement."
 Reporters Without Borders – described Nagorno-Karabakh as "becoming a news and information black hole" due to the blockade and the fact that only Azerbaijani journalists from state or pro-government media are physically permitted past checkpoints. The organization "calls on the Azerbaijani authorities and Russian peacekeepers to allow reporters freedom of movement so that they can cover this blockade and its serious humanitarian impact." Jeanne Cavelier, the head of Reporters Without Borders’s Eastern Europe and Central Asia desk commented on an instance where Azeri state media deliberately misquoted a journalist as falsely suggesting there was no blockade: “This barefaced lie by a government-controlled media outlet is further evidence of a desire on the part of the Azerbaijani authorities to manipulate national and international public opinion. They not only violate the 2020 ceasefire agreement by supporting these ‘eco-activists’ but they also prevent any accurate coverage of the Lachin corridor blockade and its terrible humanitarian repercussions."

Notes

References

Works cited
Reports

External links

2022 in international relations
2023 in international relations
2022 in Azerbaijan
2023 in Azerbaijan
2022 in the Republic of Artsakh
2023 in the Republic of Artsakh
December 2022 events in Armenia
January 2023 events in Armenia
2020s in Shusha
Conflicts in 2022
Conflicts in 2023
Aftermath of the 2020 Nagorno-Karabakh war
Nagorno-Karabakh conflict
Anti-Armenianism in Azerbaijan
Ilham Aliyev
Nikol Pashinyan